Keloğlan (Turkish: 'bald boy') is a fictional character in Turkish culture.

In folklore
A well-known character in Turkish folklore, Keloğlan, also known as keleşoğlan, has the problem of being bald from birth. Despite an ugly outer appearance, he is still a clever and lucky character. He represents the Anatolian people who can have big dreams, who are virtuous, prudent, a little bald, a little romantic and very sporty.

French folklorist Paul Delarue noted that Keloglan corresponded to the Western (French) hero Le Teigneux, a youth of lowly status and/or ugly appearance that saves the day and wins the princess.

Popular culture
Stories about him were staged by Fisko Birlik, Danone Çocuk Tiyatroları and many special societies many times and attracted a lot of attention and applause. Also, there is Keloğlan ve 300 Magiclandli, written by Çalım Baya, which is an educational seminar with music and dance intended for followers.

Also, his tale was serialized by Necdet Şen in his comic book Hizli Gazeteci in 1989 at Cumhuriyet newspaper. In 1991, Remzi Bookstore published a book telling a story about him not being able to fit in and having to make a choice between the rules and his own principles.

References

Further reading 
 Özdemir, Hasan. "Kahlkopf". In: Enzyklopädie des Märchens Online. Edited by Rolf Wilhelm Brednich, Heidrun Alzheimer, Hermann Bausinger, Wolfgang Brückner, Daniel Drascek, Helge Gerndt, Ines Köhler-Zülch, Klaus Roth and Hans-Jörg Uther. Berlin, Boston: De Gruyter, 2016. https://www-degruyter-com.wikipedialibrary.idm.oclc.org/database/EMO/entry/emo.7.137/html. Accessed 2023-02-16.

External links 
The Bald Boy Keloglan and the Most Beautiful Girl in the World (Lubbock: ATON, 2003)

Turkish folklore
Fictional Turkish people
Turkic mythology